The Target is a thriller novel written by David Baldacci. It is the third installment to feature Will Robie, a highly skilled U.S. Government assassin. The book was initially published on April 22, 2014 by Grand Central Publishing.

References

External links
Official website

2014 American novels
Novels by David Baldacci
Grand Central Publishing books